Bradley Cooper is an American actor and filmmaker. He began his career by appearing in an episode of the sitcom Sex and the City (1999) and as the host of the tourism show Globe Trekker the following year. He made his screen debut in Wet Hot American Summer (2001) as a gay counselor—a role he later reprised in the web television series Wet Hot American Summer: First Day of Camp (2015). In the action television series Alias (2001–2006), Cooper achieved some success for the supporting role of Will Tippin, although he only played a major role in the series for the first few seasons.

Cooper's supporting part in the commercially successful comedy Wedding Crashers (2005) improved his career prospects, but also led to him being typecast as the best friend to the main character in such comedies as Failure to Launch (2006), The Rocker (2008), and He's Just Not That Into You (2009). During this period, Cooper also continued starring in television shows, such as the 2005 sitcom Kitchen Confidential, and played a dual role in a 2006 onstage production of Three Days of Rain. However, the former was cancelled after four episodes due to low ratings. His breakthrough came with the role of a reckless teacher in Todd Phillips' comedy The Hangover (2009), which became one of the highest grossing R-rated films of all time. Cooper continued to take on parts in several box office hits, including The A-Team (2010), Limitless, and The Hangover Part II (both in 2011).

Cooper appeared in four films in 2012, including the critically acclaimed The Place Beyond the Pines and Silver Linings Playbook. His performance in the latter in particular was widely praised, and earned him a nomination for an Academy Award for Best Actor, among other awards. Cooper's profile continued to expand as he took on major roles in several successful films—American Hustle (2013), Guardians of the Galaxy, and American Sniper (both in 2014). After receiving Academy Award nominations for American Hustle and American Sniper, he became the tenth actor in history to receive an Academy Award nomination in three consecutive years. Cooper returned to stage work for a 2014 Broadway production of The Elephant Man, where he played the severely deformed Joseph Merrick. His performance drew praise from critics, and earned him a nomination for the Tony Award for Best Actor in a Play. None of his 2015 films—Aloha, Burnt, or Joy—performed particularly well at the box office. In 2016, he appeared in the comedy drama War Dogs that he also co-produced under his and Philips' production company, Joint Effort.

In 2018, Cooper directed his first film with the highly successful musical romantic drama A Star Is Born, in which he also starred, and contributed to its writing, production, and soundtrack (alongside Lady Gaga). The soundtrack topped the charts in the UK and Ireland, and included the single "Shallow", which also peaked at number one in Ireland. In 2019, Cooper produced the psychological thriller Joker, based on the DC Comics character of the same name. It became the first R-rated film to pass the billion-dollar mark.

Film

Television

Stage

Discography

Soundtrack albums

Singles

Other charted songs

Other appearances

Theme park attractions

Notes

References

External links

Bradley Cooper on Box Office Mojo

Cooper, Bradley
Cooper, Bradley
Performances